Kevin Packet (born 14 March 1992) is a Belgian footballer who played for Cercle Brugge in the Belgian Pro League.

External links

1992 births
Living people
Belgian footballers
Cercle Brugge K.S.V. players
Belgian Pro League players

Association football midfielders